Kalispell (Montana Salish: Ql̓ispé, Kutenai language: kqayaqawakⱡuʔnam) is a city in and the county seat of Flathead County, Montana, United States. The 2020 census put Kalispell's population at 24,558. In Montana's northwest region, it is the largest city and the commercial center of the Kalispell Micropolitan Statistical Area. The name Kalispell is a Salish word meaning "flat land above the lake".

History

Using his own capital, Charles Edward Conrad, a businessman and banker from Fort Benton, Montana, formed the Kalispell Townsite Company with three other men. The townsite was quickly platted and lots began selling by the spring of 1891. Conrad built a large mansion in Kalispell in 1895. Kalispell was officially incorporated as a city in 1892. Since that time, the city has continued to grow in population, reaching 19,927 in 2010. As the largest city in northwest Montana, Kalispell serves as the county seat and commercial center of Flathead County. The city is considered a secondary trade center with a trade area of approximately 130,000. The city is home to Logan Health Medical Center, which has a 150-bed hospital facility.

Buffalo Hill Golf Club, designed by Robert Muir Graves, serves golfers in the region.

The tribal schools nearby offer classes in the Kalispel–Spokane–Flathead language, a language nest, and intensive language training for adults. There is a Salish language school and training center in nearby Arlee, Montana.

Heaven’s Gate (1980), an American western epic, was filmed in and around Kalispell.

Geography and climate
Kalispell is located at  (48.197801, −114.316068), at an elevation of 2,956 feet (901 m).

The city has a warm-summer humid continental climate (Köppen Dfb), with long, cold, and moderately snowy winters, hot and dry summers, and short springs and autumns. Snow usually occurs from late October/early November to March.

Demographics

2010 census
As of the census of 2010, there were 19,927 people, 8,638 households, and 4,944 families living in the city. The racial makeup of the city was 94.2% White, 0.2% African American, 1.3% Native American, 1.0% Asian, 0.1% Pacific Islander, 0.6% from other races, and 2.6% from two or more races. Hispanic or Latino of any race were 2.9% of the population.

Of the 8,638 households, 30.8% had children under the age of 18, 40.4% were married couples living together, 12.0% had a female family head with no husband present, 4.8% had a male family head with no wife present, and 42.8% were not classified as family units. 35.7% of all households were made up of individuals, and 14.4% were individuals 65 years old or older. The average household size was 2.26, and the average family size was 2.94.

The median age in the city was 34.5 years. 25.1% of residents were under 18; 9.5% were between the ages of 18 and 24; 27.2% were between the ages of 25 to 44; 22.7% were between the ages 45 to 64, and 14.4% were 65 years of age or older. The gender makeup of the city was 47.3% male and 52.7% female.

2000 census
As of the census of 2000, there were 14,223 people, 6,142 households, and 3,494 families living in the city. The population density was 2,605.7 people per square mile (1,005.8/km). There were 6,532 housing units at an average density of 1,196.7 per square mile (461.9/km). The racial makeup of the city was 95.84% White, 0.28% African American, 1.22% Native American, 0.56% Asian, 0.04% Pacific Islander, 0.39% from other races, and 1.66% from two or more races. Hispanic or Latino of any race were 1.55% of the population. 21.7% were of German, 12.0% Irish, 11.3% Norwegian, 10.7% English and 6.6% United States or American ancestry.

There were 6,142 households, out of which 28.9% had children under the age of 18 living with them, 42.0% were married couples living together, 11.2% had a female householder with no husband present, and 43.1% were non-families. 36.8% of all households were made up of individuals, and 15.5% had someone living alone who was 65 years of age or older. The average household size was 2.209, and the average family size was 2.92.

In the city, the population's age distribution shows 24.0% under the age of 18, 10.0% from 18 to 24, 26.8% from 25 to 44, 20.9% from 45 to 64, and 18.3% 65 years of age or older. The median age was 38 years. For every 100 females, there were 87.7 males. For every 100 females age 18 and over, there were 82.1 males.

The median income for a household in the city was $28,567, and the median income for a family was $36,554. Males had a median income of $29,431 versus $20,122 for females. The per capita income for the city was $16,224. About 10.1% of families and 15.9% of the population were below the poverty line, including 17.1% of those under age 18 and 13.0% of those age 65 or over.

Economy

Top employers 
According to the City's 2019 Comprehensive Annual Financial Report  for the fiscal year ending June 30, 2019, the top employers in the city are:

Kalispell is home to the headquarters of the Montana Rifle Company.

Education
Kalispell has a public library, a branch of the Flathead County Library. There are two high schools in Kalispell, Flathead High School and Glacier High School, along with Flathead Valley Community College.

Transportation
Kalispell is at the intersection of U.S. Routes 2 and 93.

Kalispell City Airport, in the southern part of the city, offers general aviation service.

Eagle Transit, an agency of Flathead County, offers local transit service within and connecting Kalispell, Columbia Falls and Whitefish, as well as paratransit demand-responsive service.

Agriculture
, one of Montana's last mint farms, growing peppermint and spearmint, is near Kalispell.

Local media
Kalispell is one of Montana's largest media markets. It is the state's second-largest over-the-air radio market, after Billings.

AM radio
 KGEZ 600
 KERR 750
 KJJR 880
 KOFI 1180
 KSAM 1240
 KQDE 1340

FM radio

 KLKM 88.7
 KUKL-FM 90.1
 KFLF 91.3
 KQRK 92.3
 KHNK 95.9
 KALS 97.1
 KBBZ 98.5
 KKMT 99.7
 KIBG 100.7
 KXZI-LP 101.9
 KANB-LP 102.3
 KRVO 103.1
 KZMN 103.9
 KWOL-FM 105.1
 KDBR 106.3

Television
 KCFW-TV 9 (NBC)
 KAJJ-CD 18 (CBS)
 KUKL-TV 46 (PBS)

Newspapers
 Daily Inter Lake
 Flathead Beacon

Notable people

 Ruth Anderson, composer
 James E. Atwater, retired chemist and geophysicist
 Chuck Baldwin, Constitution Party presidential candidate
 Brad Bird, Academy Award-winning director of animated films and television programs
 Asta Bowen, author
 Robert Bray, film and television actor
 Jaime Clarke, novelist and editor
 John Corapi, a former Catholic priest and speaker
 Shane Bitney Crone, activist, filmmaker, writer, speaker for LGBT rights
 William Cumming, 20th-century artist and founder of Northwest School
 Rick Dennison, offensive coordinator of NFL's Buffalo Bills, Denver Broncos
 John Edward Erickson, governor of Montana
 George Everett, American accountant, real estate broker, and politician
 John Fuller, Politician
 Frank Garner, former chief of police, security consultant, and politician
 Flip Gordon, professional wrestler
 Robin Lee Graham, circumnavigated the world at age 16
 Frank Hagel, painter and sculptor
 Tanner Hall, professional skier, Winter X-Games gold medalist in Slope-Style, Big Air and half-pipe
 T. J. Hileman, photographer of Glacier National Park
 Lex Hilliard, NFL player, New York Jets fullback
 Dorothy M. Johnson, noted author of Western fiction
 Tim Koleto, Olympic figure skater
 Brad Ludden, professional kayaker
 Sam McCullum, former NFL player
 Dylan McFarland, former Buffalo Bills offensive lineman
 Braxton Mitchell, Politician
 Andrew J. Moonen, former employee of Blackwater USA accused of murder in Iraq
 Mary Oppen, activist, photographer, wife of George Oppen
 Brock Osweiler, quarterback for Denver Broncos, Cleveland Browns
 Daniel Parker, sculptor and painter
 Charlotte Pendragon, magician/entertainer
 Eugene H. Peterson, author of The Message, a contemporary rendition of the Bible
 Shadi Petosky, author and television producer
 Ace Powell, painter and sculptor
 Margaret Qualley, actress
 Keith Regier, educator, businessman and politician
 Matt Regier, businessman and politician
 Mike Reilly, NFL quarterback, CFL quarterback, BC Lions, Edmonton Eskimos
 Stewart Rhodes
 Alice Ritzman, former LPGA golf professional
 Monsignor Alexander King Sample, Roman Catholic Archbishop of Portland, Oregon
 Robert Burns Smith, governor of Montana
 Thatcher Szalay, former Seattle Seahawks offensive lineman
 Misty Upham (1982-2014), actress
 The von Trapps, singers
 Randy Weaver
 Michelle Williams, actress

References

External links

 
 
 Kalispell Chamber of Commerce
 Kalispell Downtown Association

 
1892 establishments in Montana
Cities in Flathead County, Montana
Cities in Montana
County seats in Montana
Populated places established in 1892